Container glass is a type of glass for the production of glass containers, such as bottles, jars, drinkware, and bowls. Container glass stands in contrast to flat glass (used for windows, glass doors, transparent walls, windshields) and glass fiber (used for thermal insulation, in fiberglass composites, and optical communication).

Composition 
Container glass has a lower magnesium oxide and sodium oxide content than flat glass, and a higher silica, calcium oxide, and aluminum oxide content. Its higher content of water-insoluble oxides imparts slightly higher chemical durability against water, which is required for storage of beverages and food.

Most container glass is soda-lime glass, produced by blowing and pressing techniques, while some laboratory glassware is made from borosilicate glass.

Glass containers 
Container glass is used in the following:
 Glass bottles:
 Beer bottle
 Bologna bottle
 Fiasco
 Milk bottle
 Sealed bottles
 Wine bottles
 Jars
 Antique fruit jar
 Killing jar
 Kilner jar
 Leyden jar
 Mason jar
 Drinkware
 Bowls
 Pitchers
 Vases
 Laboratory glassware

References 

 Soroka, W, "Fundamentals of Packaging Technology", IoPP, 2002, 
 Yam, K. L., "Encyclopedia of Packaging Technology", John Wiley & Sons, 2009,